Cara Sucia (English title:Dirty Face) is a Venezuelan telenovela written by Carlos Romero and Alberto Gómez and produced by Venevisión in 1992. The telenovela was distributed internationally by Venevisión International and was dubbed into English, Russian, Mongolian, Indonesian, and (Filipino) in the Philippines.

Guillermo Dávila and Sonya Smith starred as the main protagonists with Gigi Zanchetta and Humberto García as the main antagonists.

Plot
Miguel Ángel González is a member of one of Caracas' richest families while Estrella is a poor but hard-working beautiful girl who sells newspapers in a corner everyday to earn a living. When they meet, they fall in love and begin a beautiful romance that leads to marriage. However, not everything is rosy for the couple. Miguel Ángel's parents Horacio and Rebecca are opposed to the relationship, and the obsessive passion Santa Ortigoza, Miguel Ángel's ex-girlfriend has over him. Horacio's declining mental health makes him become more and more dangerous, and he hides a secret from the past: many years ago, he murdered Estrella's mother because she rejected him and let her father be blamed for the crime. The secret is revealed once Leonardo Montenegro, Estrella's father, is released from prison and reunited with his daughter. Rebecca, Miguel Ángel's mother, begins to accept his relationship with Estrella once she learns about Horacio's secret and that she was wrong about Estrella being a gold digger, when it was actually Santa who was after their family's money.

Later, Horacio kidnaps Estrella and Miguel Ángel's twin boys, and during this time, he has begun loving them like his sons. He shoots himself after a police stand-off when the babies are wrestled away from him while Santa dies after her car is driven off a cliff.

Cast

 Guillermo Dávila as Miguel Ángel González De la Vega
 Sonya Smith as Estrella Montenegro Campuzano / Estrella "Estrellita" Camacho
 Gigi Zanchetta as Santa Ortigosa  Lavarte
 Adolfo Cubas as Antonio González De la Vega
 Humberto García as Horacio González Ferrer
 Eva Blanco as Candelaria Camacho Duval
 Chony Fuentes as Rebeca De la Vega de González
 Elio Rubens as Leonardo Montenegro 
 Helianta Cruz as Genoveva "Beba" Lavarte De Ortigoza
 Alberto Marín as Padre Lombarito
 Julio Capote as Fermín
 Marcelo Romo as Carmelo
 Simón Pestana as José Grigorio
 Solmaira Castillo as Deyanira Falcón
 Jenire Blanco
 Elizabeth López as Federica Rangel
 Rita De Gois as Carmen dos Santos
 Marcelo Rodríguez as Agustín dos Santos
 Hans Christopher as Víctor Iriarte
 Miguel Moly
 Chumico Romero
 Alexis Escamez
 Hilda Moreno as Coralia Margarita Blanco
 Coromoto Roche as Teresa
 Deyanira Hernández as Eloisa
 Gonazalo Contrras as Dr. Gordillo
 José A. Urdaneta as Chuito (Jesús Camacho)
 María A. Avallone as Karina González de la Vega
 Enrique Oliveros as Oscar
 Blanquita Vera
 Ana Martínez as Asunción
 Daniel Escamez
 Solmaira Liendo
 Joel de la Rosa as Fabián
 Eduardo Luna as Kirikó (Ángel Vargas López)

Broadcasters

References

External links
 
Opening Credits

1992 telenovelas
Venevisión telenovelas
Venezuelan telenovelas
Spanish-language telenovelas
1992 Venezuelan television series debuts
1992 Venezuelan television series endings
Television shows set in Venezuela